David Helísek (born 4 September 1982) is a Czech football midfielder who currently plays for Hodonín.

Career
In July 2019, after seven seasons with Znojmo, Helísek joined Hodonín.

External links
 at fcdac1904.com 
 at 1scznojmo.cz

References

1982 births
Living people
Association football midfielders
Czech footballers
Czech expatriate footballers
1. SC Znojmo players
FC Baník Ostrava players
PAS Lamia 1964 players
Gamma Ethniki players
FC DAC 1904 Dunajská Streda players
FC Vysočina Jihlava players
FK Hodonín players
Czech First League players
Czech National Football League players
Slovak Super Liga players
Czech expatriate sportspeople in Greece
Czech expatriate sportspeople in Slovakia
Expatriate footballers in Greece
Expatriate footballers in Slovakia